The 1900 County Championship was the 11th officially organised running of the County Championship, and ran from 7 May to 1 September 1900. Yorkshire County Cricket Club won their fourth championship title, remaining unbeaten throughout the season. Lancashire finished as runners-up, their best position since winning the Championship in 1897.

Table
 One point was awarded for a win, and one point was taken away for each loss. Final placings were decided by dividing the number of points earned by the number of completed matches (i.e. those that ended in a win or a loss), and multiplying by 100.

Records

References

External links

County Championship
County Championship seasons
County